The , an alteration of the original   is a monument in Kyoto, Japan, dedicated to the sliced noses of killed Korean soldiers and civilians as well as Ming Chinese troops taken as war trophies during the Japanese invasions of Korea from 1592 to 1598. The monument enshrines the severed noses of at least 38,000 Koreans and over 30,000 Chinese killed during Toyotomi Hideyoshi's invasions.
The shrine is located just to the west of Toyokuni Shrine, the Shinto shrine honoring Hideyoshi in Kyoto.

History
Traditionally, Japanese warriors brought back the heads of enemies slain on the battlefield as proof of their deeds. Nose collection in lieu of heads became a feature of the second Korean invasion.  Originally, remuneration was paid to soldiers by their daimyō commanders based on the severed heads upon submission to collection stations, where inspectors meticulously counted, recorded, salted and packed the heads bound for Japan. However, because of the number of civilians killed along with soldiers, and crowded conditions on the ships that transported troops, it was far easier to just bring back noses instead of whole heads. Hideyoshi was especially insistent upon receiving noses of people his samurai had killed as proof that his men really were killing people in Korea.

Japanese chroniclers on the second invading campaign mention that the ears hacked off the faces of the massacred were also of ordinary civilians mostly in the provinces Gyeongsang, Jeolla, and Chungcheong.  In the second invasion, Hideyoshi's orders were thus:

One hundred and sixty-thousand Japanese troops had gone to Korea where they had taken 185,738 Korean heads and 29,014 Chinese ones, a grand total of 214,752.  As some might have been discarded, it is impossible to enumerate how many were killed in total during the war.
The Mimizuka was dedicated September 28, 1597. Though the exact reasons as to its construction are not entirely known, scholars contend that during the second Japanese invasion of Korea in 1597, Toyotomi Hideyoshi demanded his commanders show receipts of their martial valor in the destruction, dispatching congratulatory letters to his high-ranking warriors in the field as evidence of their service. Hideyoshi then ordered the relics entombed in a shrine on the grounds of Hokoji Temple, and set Buddhist priests to work praying for the repose of the souls of the hundreds of thousands of Koreans from whose bodies they had come; an act that chief priest Saishō Jōtai (1548–1608) would hail as a sign of Hideyoshi's "great mercy and compassion." Other nose tombs dating from the same period are found elsewhere in Japan, such as at Okayama.

Effect on modern foreign relations
The Mimizuka is almost unknown to the Japanese public unlike to the Koreans. The British historian Stephen Turnbull called the Mimizuka "...Kyoto's least mentioned and most often avoided tourist attraction". A plaque, which was later removed, stood in front of the Ear Mound in the 1960s with the passage, "One cannot say that cutting off noses was so atrocious by the standard of the time."  Most guidebooks do not mention the Ear Mound, and only a few Japanese or foreign tourists visit the site. The majority of visiting tourists are Korean – Korean tour buses are often seen parked near the Ear Mound.

In 1982, not a single Japanese school textbook mentioned the Ear Mound.  As of 1997, the mound is referred to in about half of all high-school history textbooks according to Shigeo Shimoyama, an official of Jikkyo, a publishing company.  The publisher released the first Japanese text book mentioning the Ear Mound in the mid-1980s.  The Education Ministry of Japan at that time opposed the description as "too vivid" and pressured the publisher to reduce the tone and also to praise Hideyoshi for religiously dedicating the Ear Mound to store the spirits of the killed people.

In the 1970s under the Park Chung-hee administration, some of the officials of the South Korean government asked Japan to level the monument. However, most South Koreans said that the mound should stay in Japan as a reminder of past savagery.
Activity since the 1990s is aptly conveyed thus:

On September 28, 1997, the 400th anniversary of the Mimizuka, a ceremony was held in respect for those killed, which people of all nationalities and faiths attended. The current caretaker of Mimizuka as of August 2009 is Shimizu Shirou (清水四郎).

See also

 Anti-Korean sentiment in Japan
 Scalping
 Headhunting
 Human trophy collecting
 Nose tomb
 Yasukuni Shrine

References

External links

Asian Historical Architecture: Mimizuka
Japan-Korea Friendship Year 2005

Human trophy collecting
Japanese culture
Japanese invasions of Korea (1592–1598)
Buildings and structures in Kyoto
Monuments and memorials in Japan
Tourist attractions in Kyoto
Nose